The Luxgen URX is a 7-seater mid-size crossover (CUV) produced by the Taiwanese car company Luxgen. The midsize crossover was also planned to be produced and sold in China by the Dongfeng-Yulon Luxgen joint venture but Luxgen ceased production in China.

Overview
The URX was developed under Yulon's R&D center, HAITEC. Based on the same platform as, but being positioned above the Luxgen U6 compact crossover, the URX crossover can provide up to 7 seats and even a special platform in the luggage area for wheelchair and cargo storage. It was first launched in Taiwan in 2019, and is priced at NT$848,000 to NT$1.12 million (US$28,021 to US$37,009).

Gearbox is a 6-speed manumatic transmission.

URX Neo
The URX received a facelift for the 2023 model year called the URX Neo. The URX Neo features a redesigned front fascia and full-width tail lights while powertrain remains unchanged. The redesigned instrument panel information is integrated and projected on the HUD head-up display through AR augmented reality, and a 12-inch HD touch screen is used to display various items of driving information and adjust the settings of various functions of the vehicle. The central control touch screen host has introduced the Luxgen Think+ 5.0 human factor interface, and increased the resolution of the AR view to 1.2 million pixels.

References

External links

 Luxgen China
 Luxgen URX Official Taiwanese Website

URX
Front-wheel-drive vehicles
Compact sport utility vehicles
2020s cars
Cars introduced in 2019